Rev Basil D Pratt (born 26 June 1938) is a former British sprint canoer who competed in the early 1960s.  He was eliminated in the repechages of the K-2 1000 m event at the 1960 Summer Olympics in Rome. A former Padre in the British Army, Basil Pratt was married on 19 December 1992 at the age of fifty four.
He lives with his family in the south-west of Scotland.

References 
 Sports-reference.com profile

1938 births
Canoeists at the 1960 Summer Olympics
Living people
Olympic canoeists of Great Britain
British male canoeists